D. J. Sokol Arena is a multi-purpose student recreational facility in Omaha, Nebraska. It was opened on August 28, 2009.  It currently hosts the Creighton Bluejays women's basketball and volleyball teams.  It has a seating capacity of 2,950 spectators.

See also
 List of NCAA Division I basketball arenas

References

External links
Stadium information
Article on arena

Sports venues completed in 2009
College basketball venues in the United States
Creighton Bluejays basketball venues
Sports venues in Omaha, Nebraska
Indoor arenas in Nebraska
2009 establishments in Nebraska
Basketball venues in Nebraska
College volleyball venues in the United States